Augusta Read Thomas (born April 24, 1964) is an American composer and professor.

Biography 
Thomas studied composition with Oliver Knussen at Tanglewood; Jacob Druckman at Yale University; Alan Stout and Bill Karlins at Northwestern University; and at the Royal Academy of Music in London (1989). She was a Bunting Fellow at Radcliffe College in 1990–91 and a Junior Fellow in the Society of Fellows at Harvard University from 1991 to 1994. Thomas was the longest-serving Mead Composer-in-Residence with the Chicago Symphony, for Daniel Barenboim and Pierre Boulez, from 1997 to 2006. This residency culminated in the premiere of Astral Canticle for solo flute, solo violin and orchestra, one of two finalists for the 2007 Pulitzer Prize in Music. During her residency, Thomas premiered nine commissioned orchestral works and helped establish the MusicNOW series.

Thomas has won an Ernst von Siemens Composers' Prize, among many other awards. She is a member of the American Academy of Arts and Sciences and the American Academy of Arts and Letters.
A former chairperson of the American Music Center, she serves on many boards and, according to the American Academy of Arts and Letters, "has become one of the most recognizable and widely loved figures in American Music."
Recent and upcoming commissions include those from the Santa Fe Opera in collaboration with the San Francisco Opera and several other opera companies, PEAK Performances at Montclair State University and the Martha Graham Dance Company, The Cathedral Choral Society of Washington D.C, The Indianapolis Symphony, Tanglewood, The Kaleidoscope Chamber Orchestra, Des Moines Symphony, Boston Symphony, the Utah Symphony, Wigmore Hall in London, Indianapolis Symphonic Choir, JACK quartet, Third Coast Percussion, Spektral Quartet, Chicago Philharmonic, Eugene Symphony, the Danish Chamber Players, Notre Dame University, Janet Sung, and the Fromm Foundation.

Early life and education (1964–1989) 
Thomas was born in 1964 in Glen Cove, New York. She is one of 10 children of James A. and Susan N. Thomas (née Norton). Her mother was a kindergarten teacher for 30 years at the Green Vale School. Augusta attended St. Paul's School, a boarding high school in Concord, New Hampshire. She began piano lessons at the age of 4, and her teacher often assigned her small composition projects on the side; Thomas has said that these small projects sparked her interest in composition. She took up trumpet in third grade.

After graduating from high school, Thomas enrolled as a music student (specializing in trumpet performance) at Northwestern University in 1983. Northwestern's composition program is prominent today, but did not exist when Thomas was an undergraduate. An exception was made for her to pursue composition. Thomas studied with faculty members and composers Alan Stout and M. William Karlins.

After earning a bachelor's degree from Northwestern, Thomas attended Yale University to pursue a master's degree in composition. There she studied with Jacob Druckman. Thomas did not complete a degree program at Yale, finishing her master's degree at the Royal Academy of Music in London. There, she studied with Paul Patterson, the Manson Chair of Composition Faculty. Seven years after graduating from the Royal Academy of Music in London, Thomas was elected one of its Associates (ARAM, honorary degree), and in 2004 was elected a Fellow of the Royal Academy of Music . In 1998, she received the Distinguished Alumni Association Award from St. Paul's School. In 1999, she won the Award of Merit from the President of Northwestern University, and a year later received Northwestern's Alumnae Award.

Immediately after receiving her degree from the Royal Academy of Music, Thomas was awarded a Guggenheim Fellowship in 1989. At 23, she was the youngest woman recipient of the honor at the time.

Career 
In 1994, Thomas married the British composer Bernard Rands. In 1997, Russian-American cellist Mstislav Rostropovich and the Boston Symphony Orchestra premiered cello concerti by both Thomas and Rands in Boston Symphony Hall and at Carnegie Hall. Paul Griffiths wrote that Thomas “had led the way [for the performance], introducing [Rands] to Mr. Rostropovich. Then, when the Boston Symphony asked Mr. Rostropovich what he would like for his 70th birthday, he said he wanted a new concerto, and wanted it from Mr. Rands”.

Shortly after the completion of her Guggenheim Fellowship, Thomas began teaching at the Eastman School of Music. She received tenure there at age 33. While at Eastman, she was appointed Mead Composer in Residence at the Chicago Symphony Orchestra by conductors Pierre Boulez and Daniel Barenboim. She is the longest-serving Mead Composer in Residence, holding the position from 1997 to 2006. Her residency culminated in the 2007 premier of her work Astral Canticle, one of two finalists for the Pulitzer Prize in Music.

Shortly after receiving tenure at Eastman, Thomas returned to Chicago to teach at the Northwestern University School of Music until 2008.

In 2010, the University of Chicago announced that Thomas would be appointed University Professor of Composition in the Department of Music and the College. She is the 16th designated professor to be appointed by the University. In 2018, it was announced that Thomas had created the Chicago Center for Contemporary Composition (CCCC) at the University of Chicago. The CCCC includes the Grossman Ensemble, underwritten by the Sanford J. Grossman Charitable Trust, which was designed to extend the legacy of the Contemporary Chamber Players. Thomas said she “hoped to enrich the university's long and distinguished history in contemporary music” with the CCCC, which is in its third season.

In 2016, Thomas created and co-curated the Ear Taxi Festival, which featured over 350 musicians, 88 composers, and 54 world premieres. The two-day festival took place in Chicago and was meant to celebrate the city's “vibrant and booming contemporary classical music scene”. The festival's success earned Thomas the title “Chicagoan of the Year” from Chicago magazine, and is set to return to the city in the future.

For the 2014–15 academic year, Thomas was a Phi Beta Kappa Scholar. She was MUSICALIVE Composer-in-Residence with the New Haven Symphony, a national residency program of The League of American Orchestras and Meet the Composer.

Thomas’s most recent works include an opera, Sweet Potato Kicks the Sun, that premiered at the Santa Fe Opera in 2019. The opera is meant for audiences of all ages and stars professional beatboxer Nicole Paris. Thomas co-wrote the piece with Leslie Dunton-Downer, a longtime collaborator of hers and a published writer and librettist. There are plans for the opera to tour the United States in the near future.

Thomas's chamber opera LIGEIA, based on Poe's short story of the same title, received the International Orpheus Prize and was performed in Spoleto, Italy. Commissioned by Mstislav Rostropovich and Rencontres Musicales d'Evian, LIGEIA was premiered by Rostropovich at the 1994 Evian Festival. The American premiere took place at the Aspen Music Festival on July 27, 1995.

Thomas lives in Chicago with her husband, teaches at the University of Chicago, directs the Center for Contemporary Composition, and composes. Her additional titles include:

 Founder and Director of The Chicago Center for Contemporary Composition
 Founded and runs the Grossman Ensemble for which she commissions and premieres the works of numerous other composers.
 Vice President for Music, The American Academy of Arts and Letters
 Member of the Board of Directors of The Koussevitzky Foundation
 Member of the Board of Directors of The Aaron Copland Fund for Music
 Member of the Board of Directors of the Alice M. Ditson Fund, Columbia University
 Member of the Conseil Musical de la Foundation Prince Pierre de Monaco
 Member of the Board of Trustees, American Society for the Royal Academy of Music, London
 Member of  the Eastman National Council
 Member of the advisory board of Third Coast Percussion
 Member of the advisory board of the Civitas Ensemble
 Member of the advisory board of the Picosa Ensemble
 Member of the International Contemporary Ensemble Board of Directors, 2007–2013
 Chair of the Board, American Music Center, 2005–2008
 Board member, American Music Center, 2000–2011
 Envisioned, created EAR TAXI FESTIVAL, October 5–10, 2016 in Chicago
 Elected to membership, The American Academy of Arts and Letters, 2009
 Elected to Membership, The American Academy of Arts and Sciences in 2011
 Mead Composer-in-Residence, Chicago Symphony Orchestra, 1997–2006
 Curator and director of the Festival of Contemporary Music, Tanglewood Music Center, 2009

Selected awards and honors 
She was nominated for the 36th annual Chicago Music Awards in 2017.
Her album Of Being is a Bird received BBC Music Magazine's Chamber Choice award in 2016.
The Sovereign Prince of Monaco made Thomas a Chevalier of the Order of Cultural Merit in 2015.
Thomas won Lancaster Symphony Orchestra's Composer Award for the 2015–16 season.
Lincoln Academy of Illinois awarded Thomas the Order of Lincoln in 2014.
Ceremonial, for orchestra, was chosen as a Recommended Work at the UNESCO International Rostrum of Composers in 2001.
In 2001, Thomas received an Academy Award in Music from the American Academy of Arts and Letters.
Thomas won an Ernst von Siemens Composers' Prize in 2000.
Chanticleer's album Colors of Love, featuring two works by Thomas, won a Grammy in 2000.

Selected recent and upcoming projects 
 Forest Of Shifting Time a ballet (2022) Choreographed and directed by BalletCollective Artistic Director Troy Schumacher and set to a vibrant 32-minute score for the Detroit-based Akropolis Reed Quintet, the ballet features whimsical costumes and props by artist and designer Doug Fitch and lighting by Ben Rawson. Featuring dancers trained in a multitude of methodologies, including dancers from New York City Ballet and alumni of The Ailey School and The Juilliard School: Graham Feeny, Jada German, Megan LeCrone, Zoe Liebold, Shelby Mann, Ava Sautter, Maxwell Simoes, and Haley Winegarden. November 2 and 3, 2022 at Trinity Commons, 76 Trinity Place, New York, NY.
 Bebop Riddle II for cello and piano (2022) was commissioned by Tanglewood Music Center and the Boston Symphony Orchestra.
 Sunburst a fanfare for youth orchestra (2022) Ideal for youth, community, and college orchestras was commissioned  by the Tampa Metropolitan Youth Orchestra, Dr. William Wiedrich, Music Director & Conductor.
 Dance Foldings for orchestra (2021) was commissioned by Radio 3 and premiered on August 8, 2021 by BBC National Orchestra of Wales conducted by Ryan Bancroft at the Royal Albert Hall as part of BBC Proms 2021. The USA Premiere was given by the Boston Symphony Orchestra, Andris Nelsons, conducting in Boston Symphony Hall on January 13, 14, 15, 16 2022
 Crackle for wind ensemble (2021) was commissioned by a consortium of wind ensembles and was premiered on October 22, 2021 by the University of Michigan Wind Ensemble, conducted by Michael Haithcock.
 Far Past War for large chorus and orchestra (2018), text by Cammy Thomas, commissioned and premiered by the Cathedral Choral Society of Washington, D.C., conducted by Steven Fox in the Washington National Cathedral on March 13, 2022.  Made possible by the William Remsen Strickland Endowment Fund “to remember the concerts of the Cathedral Choral Society during World War II.”
Upon Wings of Words, Emily Dickinson Settings (2021) for soprano and string quartet premiered at the Ravinia Festival, NEXUS Chamber Music with Kristina Bachrach soprano soloist.
Filigree of the Sun for string quartet (2018) was premiered on August 4 and 6, 2021 by FLUX Quartet at the Santa Fe Chamber Music Festival.
Dance Mobile for small chamber orchestra (or for 13 players) in memoriam Oliver Knussen (2020), was commissioned by the Howard Hanson Institute for American Music in Celebration of the 100th Anniversary of the Eastman School of Music
 The Boston Symphony Orchestra (Andris Nelsons, Music Director) commissioned Magic Box to celebrate the opening of its Tanglewood Center for Music and Learning on June 28, 2019
Con Moto for percussion quartetwas premiered on October 16, 2020 by Third Coast Percussion at the time that Thomas was Distinguished Guest Composer at the annual Bowling Green New Music Festival.
 Thomas’s "Gwendolyn Brooks Settings" for Treble Chorus and Orchestra composed in 2018. Text by Gwendolyn Brooks received its world premiere on March 11, 2023 after a 3-year Covid Pandemic delay, by Anima – Glen Ellyn Children’s Chorus and the Illinois Philharmonic Orchestra, Stilian Kirov, conducting, Charles Sundquist, Chorus, Director.
Thomas’s opera Sweet Potato Kicks the Sun (librettist: Leslie Dunton-Downer) premiered at the Santa Fe Opera, directed by John de los Santos and conducted by Carmen Flórez-Mansi, who also serves as Youth Chorus Director.
Fanfare of Hope and Solidarity for orchestra premiered on May 22, 2020, by the Utah Symphony, Thierry Fischer, conducting. During a period of mandatory social distancing, each musician performed from their home and the performance was edited together and premiered on YouTube.
The Indianapolis Symphony is to premier Sun Dance for orchestra, in memoriam Oliver Knussen (2018), in 2023, after a 3-year Covid Pandemic delay, Krzysztof Urbański, conducting
The Auditions, a ballet for chamber orchestra commissioned and premiered by PEAK PERFORMANCES and Martha Graham Dance Company in 2019 with choreography by Troy Schumacher.
The Des Moines Symphony commissioned and premiered Brio for orchestra in 2018.
The Chicago Philharmonic Society and Eugene Symphony Association co-commissioned by premiered Sonorous Earth for percussion quartet and orchestra in 2017. Sonorous Earth is conceived as a cultural statement celebrating interdependence and commonality across all cultures and as a musical statement celebrating the beauty and diversity of expression of bell sounds.
Jack Quartet and Third Coast Percussion premiered Selene, Moon Chariot and Rituals for percussion quartet and string quartet on March 5, 2015 as part of a “portrait concert” at Columbia University's Miller Theatre. It was co-commissioned by the Tanglewood Music Center in honor of its 75th Anniversary Season, Miller Theatre, and Third Coast Percussion.
Helios Choros (Sun God Dancers), a triptych for orchestra (2006–2007). Helios Choros I was commissioned by the Dallas Symphony, is dedicated to Sir Andrew Davis, Victor Marshall, and the Dallas Symphony Orchestra, and was premiered on May 3, 2007, by the Dallas Symphony with Davis conducting. Helios Choros II was co-commissioned by the London Symphony Orchestra and Boston Symphony Orchestra and premiered by the LSO on December 14, 2008, Daniel Harding conducting. Helios Choros III, commissioned by the Orchestra of Paris, is dedicated to Christoph Eschenbach and premiered on December 12, 2007, in Paris at a festival curated by Pierre Boulez at which his music and the music of other composers of his choice was featured.
Jennifer Kelly's upcoming book In Her Own Words: Conversations with Composers in the United States (New Perspectives on Gender in Music) features Thomas.

Selected works

Orchestral 
Cello Concerto No. 1 – Vigil (1990), for cello solo & chamber orchestra
Meditation (1990), concerto for trombone & orchestra
Words of the Sea (1995), for orchestra – Homage to Debussy
Violin Concerto – Spirit Musings (1997), for violin solo & chamber orchestra
Concerto for Orchestra – Orbital Beacons (1998)
Ceremonial (1999), for orchestra
Cello Concerto No. 2 – Ritual Incantations (1999), for cello solo, concertino group of flute, oboe & violin soli, & chamber orchestra
Ring Out Wild Bells, to the Wild Sky (2000), for soprano solo, S.A.T.B. choir & orchestra
Song in Sorrow (2000), for soprano solo, female-voice sextet, S.A.T.B. choir & orchestra
Daylight Divine (2001), for soprano solo, children's choir & orchestra
magnecticfireflies (2001), for concert band
Prayer Bells (2001), for orchestra
Canticle Weaving (2002), concerto for trombone and orchestra
Chanting to Paradise (2002), for soprano solo, S.A.T.B. choir & orchestra
Sunlight Echoes (2002), for S.A.T.B. choir & orchestra
Trainwork (2002), for orchestra
Dancing Galaxy (2004), for concert band
Galaxy Dances (2004), a tone poem for orchestra
Gathering Paradise (2004), song-cycle for soprano & orchestra
Silver Chants the Litanies (2004), concerto for horn & chamber orchestra – in memoriam Luciano Berio
Tangle (2004), for orchestra
Astral Canticle (2005), for double concerto violin, flute soli & orchestra
Credences of Summer (2005), for orchestra
Violin Concerto No. 2 – Carillon Sky (2005), for violin solo & orchestra or for alto saxophone solo & orchestra
Prayer and Celebration (2006), for chamber orchestra
Helios Choros I (2007), for orchestra
Helios Choros III (2007), for orchestra
Terpsichore's Dream (2007), for chamber orchestra
Absolute Ocean (2008), for soprano, harp soli & chamber orchestra
Dream Threads (2008), for chamber orchestra
Helios Choros II (2008), for orchestra
Violin Concerto No. 3 – Juggler in Paradise (2008), for violin solo & orchestra
Jubilee (2009), for orchestra
Of Paradise and Light (2010), for string orchestra
Radiant Circles (2010), for orchestra [Featuring Brass and Timpani; the percussion set up is very small requiring very few instruments.]
Cello Concerto No. 3 – Legend of the Phoenix (2013)
Aureole (2013)
Hemke Concerto "Prisms of Light" (2014), for alto saxophone and orchestra
EOS (Goddess of the Dawn) (2015), for orchestra
Plea for Peace (2017), a vocalise for soprano and string quartet or string orchestra
Sonorous Earth (2017), for solo percussion quartet playing bells from around the world (approximately 300 pieces of metal) and chamber orchestra
Brio (2018), for orchestra
The Auditions (2019), for chamber orchestra
Clara's Ascent (2019), for string orchestra or string quartet featuring solo cello
Magic Box (2019), for percussion quartet and string quartet or string orchestra
Memory Palace (2019), for string orchestra (no basses)
Fanfare of Hope and Solidarity (2020), for orchestra
Far Past War (2020), for SATB chorus and orchestra. Texts by Cammy Thomas.
Sun Dance (2020), for orchestra in memoriam Oliver Knussen
Gwendolyn Brooks Settings (2019–2020), for treble chorus and orchestra. [Treble Chorus can be composed of a mix of adult sopranos, mezzo-sopranos, altos, with youth girl and boy sopranos, mezzo-sopranos, and altos.]
Crackle (2020), for wind ensemble
Dance Mobile (2021), for small chamber orchestra (or for 13 players) – in memoriam Oliver Knussen
Dancing Stars (2021), for open instrumentation orchestra or chamber ensemble of no less than 8 players. Instrumentation may include a group of voices singing open vowels.
Dance Foldings (2021), for orchestra, commissioned by Radio 3 and premiered at BBC Proms 2021
Carnival (Bassoon Concerto) (2022), for bassoon and wind ensemble; and in version for bassoon and orchestra. [Solo part can be played by bassoon, baritone saxophone, euphonium or trombone.]
Sunburst (2022), a fanfare for orchestra (Ideal for youth, community, and college orchestras. Celebratory and optimistic. Only a tiny percussion set up is needed.)
FIESTA! (no chaser!) (2023), for trumpet in C and wind ensemble; and in version for trumpet and orchestra
Cosmic Carnival (2023), for wind ensemble of 26 players

Choral 
Alleluia (Midsummer Blaze) (1993), for a cappella S.A.T.B. choir
The Rub of Love (1995), for a cappella S.A.T.B. choir
Psalm 91: Verse 11 (1996), for a cappella S.A.T.B. choir
Love Songs (1997), for a cappella S.A.T.B. choir
Ring Out Wild Bells, to the Wild Sky (2000), for soprano solo, S.A.T.B. choir & orchestra
Daylight Divine (2001), for soprano solo, children's choir & orchestra
Chanting to Paradise (2002), for soprano solo, S.A.T.B. choir & orchestra
Song in Sorrow (2002), for soprano solo, female-voice sextet, S.A.T.B. choir & orchestra
Sunlight Echoes (2002), for S.A.T.B. choir & orchestra
Four Basho Settings (2002), for a cappella children's choir
Fruit of my Spirit (2004), for a cappella S.A.T.B. choir
Purple Syllables (2004), for a cappella S.A.T.B. choir
The Rewaking (2005), for a cappella T.T.B.B. choir
Juggler of the Day (2007), for a cappella S.S.A.A. choir
Roses (2008), for S.S.A.A. choir & piano
Two E. E. Cummings Songs (2008), for S.S.A.A. choir
Flash (2011), for S.A.T.B & orchestra
Spells (2013), for S.A.T.B
Dappled Things (2015), for male or female chorus
!HOPE (2017), for S.S.S.A.A choir
Far Past War (2020), for S.A.T.B chorus and orchestra [Texts by Cammy Thomas]
Gwendolyn Brooks Settings (2020), for treble chorus and orchestra
Freedom: To Be Free and Sky Bound In Memoriam Rosa Parks (2022), for treble voices or for tenor & baritone voices
Light from the Heart (2022), for S.A.T.B. chorus - commemorating the 400th anniversary of William Byrd’s death
Become the Sky (2022), for S.A.T.B. chorus
Countenance of the Sun (2022), for S.A.T.B. chorus (The text celebrates love)

Chamber 
Chant (1991, rev. 2002), for alto saxophone/cello/viola & piano
Passion Prayers (1999), for cello solo & flute, clarinet, violin, piano, harp & percussion
...a circle around the sun... (2000), for piano trio
Fugitive Star (2000), for string quartet
Invocations (2000), for string quartet
Ring Flourish Blaze (2000), for sixteen brass
Eagle at Sunrise (2001), for string quartet
Murmers in the Mist of Memory (2001), for eleven strings
Rumi Settings (2001), for violin & cello or violin & viola
In My Sky at Twilight (2002), song-cycle for soprano & large ensemble
Light the First Light of Evening (2002), for large ensemble
Rise Chanting (2002), for string quartet
Final Soliloquy of the Interior Paramour (2004), for mezzo-soprano, tenor soli & large ensemble
Memory: Swells (2005), for two guitars
Moon Jig (2005), for piano trio
Angel Tears and Earth Prayers (2006), for trumpet & organ
Silent Moon (2006), for violin & viola
Toft Serenade (2006), for violin & piano
Dancing Helix Rituals (2007), for clarinet, violin & piano
Cantos for Slava (2007), for cello/viola & piano
Scat (2007), for oboe, harpsichord (or piano), violin, viola & cello
Scherzi Musicali (2007), for horn, two trumpets & trombone
Squeeze (2007), for saxophone quartet
Fête (2010), for brass ensemble
Pilgrim Soul (2011), for cor Anglais & two violins
Resounding Earth (2012), for percussion ensemble
Of Being is a Bird, Emily Dickinson Settings (2015), for soprano and 9 players (It is optional to substitute the soprano with either a flute, oboe, English horn, clarinet, soprano saxophone, alto saxophone, trumpet, or viola)
Helix Spirals (2015), for string quartet
Avian Capriccio (2016), for 2 trumpet in C, horn, trombone, tuba
Avian Escapades (2016), for flute, oboe, clarinet, bassoon, horn
Klee Musings (2016), for piano trio
qì (2016), for percussion quartet
Chi (2017), for string quartet
Plea for Peace (2017), a vocalise for soprano and string quartet or string orchestra (The vocalise solo line can also be performed by Flute, Alto Flute, Oboe, Clarinet, Trumpet, Soprano Saxophone, Violin, Viola, Cello, or Countertenor in place of the Soprano.) May also be performed with string orchestra (no basses).
Acrobats (2018), for flute, bass clarinet, violin, cello, and piano [Bass clarinet can be substituted by baritone saxophone or bassoon.]
Con Moto (2018), for percussion quartet
Ripple Effects (2018), for carillon (Three versions are available: 4 players (with many additional players joining in as piece accumulates) 72 bells, F-compass. 2 players, 53 bells, G-compass. 2 players, 48 (or 47) bells, C-compass.
Song Without Words (2018), for soloist and piano
The Auditions (2019), for chamber orchestra
Clara's Ascent (2019), for string quartet or string orchestra featuring solo cellist of the quartet or the cello section of the string orchestra
Magic Box (2019), for percussion quartet and string quartet
Memory Palace (2019), for string orchestra (no basses)
Your Kiss (2019), for soprano and piano or mezzo-soprano and piano or tenor and piano
Star Box (2019–2020), for percussion quartet
Magic Gardens (2020), for string quartet. Inspired by and based on Isaiah Zagar’s Magic Gardens
Dancing Stars (2021), for open instrumentation orchestra or chamber ensemble of no less than 8 players. Instrumentation may include a group of voices singing open vowels.
Dance Mobile (2021), for 13 players – in memoriam Oliver Knussen
Upon Wings of Words, Emily Dickinson Settings (2021) for soprano and string quartet; a version in a lower "key" for mezzo soprano and string quartet is published as well.
Stardust (2021), quintet for soloist and string quartet: (soloists could be: English horn, oboe, clarinet, soprano saxophone, alto saxophone, flute, or trumpet in C)
Crescat Scientia; Vita Excolatur (2021), for carillon, 4 players (8 hands and 2 feet) (with many additional players joining in as composition accumulates) 72 bells, F-compass.
Rings of Light (2021), a fanfare for 9 saxophones (or saxophone ensemble) (or for 9 clarinets or clarinet ensemble – 3 bass clarinets and 6 clarinets)
Bebop Riddle II (2022), for cello and piano (or string bass and piano) -The entire work is pizzicato for the cellist or bass player (Also a version for marimba and piano]
Bebop Riddle IV (2022), for reed quintet (Oboe, Clarinet in Bb, Alto Saxophone in Eb, Bass Clarinet in Bb, Bassoon) – several other woodwind combination versions exist for this composition.
Illuminations: Fanfare Sinfonia, for Solo Timpani, 9 Brass, and 3 Percussion  (2023), [2 horns, 4 trumpets in C, 2 trombones, 1 bass trombone, timpani, and 3 percussion (very small percussion instrumentation)]
 Forest Of Shifting Time a ballet (2022), for reed quintet (Oboe, Clarinet in Bb, Alto Saxophone in Eb, Bass Clarinet in Bb, Bassoon) – several other woodwind combination versions exist for this composition.
Cosmic Carnival (2023), for wind ensemble of 26 players
Terpsichore's Box of Dreams (2023), for and ensemble of 13 virtuosi

Solo instrumental 
Incantation (1995), for solo violin, solo viola, or solo cello
Spring Song (1995), for cello
Bells Ring Summer (2000), for cello
Pulsar (2002), for violin, solo viola, or solo cello
Rush (2004), for violin
Caprice (2005), for violin
D(i)agon(als) (2005), for clarinet (and there is a version for solo soprano, alto, tenor, or baritone saxophone)
Six Etudes (1996-2005), for piano
Traces (2006), for piano
Eurythmy Etude – "Still Life" (2007), for piano
Love Twitters (2007), for piano
Euterpe's Caprice (2008), for flute
Dream Catcher (2009), for solo violin, solo viola, or solo cello
Starlight Ribbons (2013), for piano
Capricious Toccata (2016), for violin or viola
Rainbow Bridge to Paradise (2016), for solo cello, solo violin, or solo viola
Rhea Enchanted (2016), for solo cello, solo violin, or solo viola
Venus Enchanted (2016), for solo cello, solo violin, or solo viola
Two Thoughts About The Piano (2017), for solo piano
Song Without Words (2018), for soloist and piano
Bell Illuminations (2020–2021), for solo piano
Bebop Riddle (2021), for solo marimba
Enchanted Invocation (2021), for solo vibraphone and 5 crotales
Amalgam (2021), for solo piano
Riddle (2022), for solo cello – in memoriam Oliver Knussen
Laetitia's Caprice (2023), a fanfare for solo soprano saxophone

References

External links 
 Official Augusta Read Thomas website
 Augusta Read Thomas on the University of Chicago's website
 Augusta Read Thomas Nimbus Catalogue
 Interview with Augusta Read Thomas, December 3, 1993

1964 births
Living people
20th-century classical composers
20th-century women composers
21st-century classical composers
21st-century women composers
Alumni of the Royal Academy of Music
American classical composers
American composers
American women classical composers
Bienen School of Music alumni
Composers for carillon
Ernst von Siemens Composers' Prize winners
Fellows of the American Academy of Arts and Sciences
Northwestern University alumni
Northwestern University faculty
People from Glen Cove, New York
People from Lee, Massachusetts
Pupils of Jacob Druckman
Pupils of Lukas Foss
St. Paul's School (New Hampshire) alumni
University of Chicago faculty
American women academics
21st-century American women
Members of the American Academy of Arts and Letters